Bekisopa is a town in the region of Haute Matsiatra in central Madagascar. It is part of the municipality of Tanamarina.

See also
the Bekisopa mine, a, iron ore mine.

Populated places in Haute Matsiatra